Murillo is a town and municipality in the Tolima department of Colombia.  The population of the municipality was 4,953 as of the 2005 census, 1,569 who lived within the town of Murillo, the remainder in rural areas of the municipality.

Murillo is 144 km from the provincial capital, Ibagué. The municipality is bordered on the north by Villahermosa, on the south by Santa Isabel, in the east by Líbano, and to the west by the Departments of Caldas and Risaralda. Murillo is the highest town in the department of Tolima with an altitude of 2950 m above sea level.

The western border of the municipality includes the peaks of Nevado del Ruiz, Nevado El Cisne, and Nevado Santa Isabel.

Climate
Murillo has a cold subtropical highland climate (Cfb) with heavy rainfall year round.

References

Municipalities of Tolima Department